Canton Tower Station  is an interchange station on Line 3 and Zhujiang New Town Automated People Mover Systems of the Guangzhou Metro. It started operations on 28 December 2005. It is an underground station located to the south of Binjiang Road East in Haizhu District, on the south bank of the Pearl River.

The station was previously called Chigang Pagoda Station, named after the nearby Chigang Pagoda which, despite being a relatively lesser-known architectural heritage in Guangzhou, was the only recognisable structure in the immediate vicinity when the station was constructed. However, after the station was opened, the Canton Tower, a new TV and sightseeing tower, was built directly above it. This iconic piece of architecture quickly became the city's new landmark, and the name of the station was often confused with Chigang station of line 8, so it was changed to Canton Tower Station in December 2013 when line 6 was opened. It is the first station built for sightseeing purposes in the Guangzhou Metro system. The station is connected to an underground APM system which provides quick access to the Zhujiang New Town CBD across the river.

The station is the terminus of the Haizhu Tram line of Guangzhou Trams, which runs to Wanshengwei Station.

Station layout

Exits

References

Railway stations in China opened in 2005
Guangzhou Metro stations in Haizhu District